William Joseph Scherle (March 14, 1923August 27, 2003) was an American politician who served as a U.S. Representative from Southwestern Iowa from 1967 to 1975. He was a member of the Republican Party.

Early life 
Born in Little Falls, New York, Scherle graduated from St. Mary's Academy in New York, New York. He served in the United States Navy and Coast Guard from 1942 to 1946, then attended Southern Methodist University of Dallas, Texas from 1945 to 1947.

Career 
After briefly serving in 1947 as an assistant division manager with George D. Barnard Co. of Dallas, in 1948 he moved to southwestern Iowa, where he became a grain and livestock farmer. He also served in the United States Naval Reserve from 1947 to 1954. He rose to the rank Boatswain's Mate Chief Petty Officer.

Scherle served as chair of the Mills County Republican Central Committee from 1956 to 1964. In 1960 he was elected as a Republican to the Iowa House of Representatives, where he served until 1966.

In 1966, Scherle was elected to represent Iowa's 7th congressional district in the U.S. House of Representatives, unseating incumbent Democrat John R. Hansen. He was re-elected to that seat in 1968 and 1970.  When reapportionment resulted in the loss of one congressional district in Iowa (his own), he ran and won election to Iowa's 5th congressional district in 1972, defeating then-unknown Democrat Tom Harkin.

After making a very public and national campaign against the National Endowment for the Arts, and in particular its funding of the single-word poem "lighght" by Aram Saroyan, Scherle found himself campaigned against by many of Saroyan's supporters including George Plimpton.

In 1974, he ran for re-election but was defeated by Tom Harkin. After losing his re-election bid, Scherle served as Deputy Administrator for the United States Department of Agriculture from 1975 to 1977. He later served as president of a consulting firm in Washington, D.C. from 1977 to 1987.

Death 
Scherle died in Council Bluffs, Iowa, from prostate cancer and was interred in Arlington National Cemetery.

See also
 List of members of the House Un-American Activities Committee

References

External links

1923 births
2003 deaths
People from Mills County, Iowa
People from Little Falls, New York
Southern Methodist University alumni
Republican Party members of the Iowa House of Representatives
Military personnel from New York (state)
Burials at Arlington National Cemetery
Republican Party members of the United States House of Representatives from Iowa
20th-century American politicians
United States Coast Guard personnel of World War II
United States Navy sailors
United States Navy reservists